= Jack Anderton (political campaigner) =

British political campaigner

Jack Anderton (born October 2000) is a British political campaigner and communications consultant associated with Reform UK and Nigel Farage. He has been described in media coverage as contributing to digital campaign strategy and social media output, particularly on TikTok, during the 2024 general election.

== Early life and education ==
Anderton was born in October 2000 and is from Liverpool. He studied Religion, Politics and Society at King's College London.

== Career ==
After graduating, Anderton spent a period outside formal employment before applying in 2023 for a role working on Nigel Farage's social media output.

He was reported to have worked with Farage during the 2024 general election campaign as a contractor focusing on digital and social media strategy. Coverage described him as being involved in the development of Farage's TikTok content and broader online presence, contributing to efforts to reach younger audiences.

Media reporting has associated Anderton with the growth of Farage's social media accounts during this period, including TikTok, which reached over one million followers. He has also been described as part of Reform UK's wider media operation, focused on digital campaigning and online communications.

In 2025 and 2026, Anderton was described in media coverage as a social media adviser or consultant linked to Reform UK, although the party stated he had not been formally employed.

He has also written political commentary and maintained an online presence through his own website.

Earlier writing on his blog included speculative political fiction, which he later described as fictional rather than reflective of his personal views.

He has also participated in university speaking events. Student media reported protests at events at the University of York and the University of Cambridge where he was scheduled to speak.

== Political views and media coverage ==
Anderton has received national media attention in connection with political commentary and blog posts. Coverage by outlets including the BBC, The Guardian, The Independent and LBC has focused on statements attributed to him regarding British foreign policy, historical conflicts and international relations.

In interviews and commentary pieces, Anderton has disputed some interpretations of his views and described aspects of his writing as hypothetical or analytical.
